In Greek mythology, the name Arsinoos or Arsinous may refer to two minor figures associated with the Trojan War:

Arsinoos of Mysia, father of Ennomus and Chromis.
Arsinoos of Tenedos, the "great-hearted" father of Hecamede whom the Achaeans chose for Nestor since he excelled all in counsel.

Notes

References

Apollodorus, The Library with an English Translation by Sir James George Frazer, F.B.A., F.R.S. in 2 Volumes, Cambridge, MA, Harvard University Press; London, William Heinemann Ltd. 1921. ISBN 0-674-99135-4. Online version at the Perseus Digital Library. Greek text available from the same website.
Homeric variations on a lament by Briseis Page 51 by Casey Dué 
Homer, The Iliad with an English Translation by A.T. Murray, Ph.D. in two volumes. Cambridge, MA., Harvard University Press; London, William Heinemann, Ltd. 1924. . Online version at the Perseus Digital Library.
Homer, Homeri Opera in five volumes. Oxford, Oxford University Press. 1920. . Greek text available at the Perseus Digital Library.

Characters in the Iliad